Keith Guttin is an American college baseball coach who has served as the head coach of the Missouri State Bears baseball team since the start of the 1983 season. Following the 2015 season, he has 1,138 wins, and, during the 2015 season, he became only the 41st college baseball head coach to win 1,100 games.  Under Guttin, the Bears reached the 2003 College World Series.

Coaching career
Guttin is currently 11th in most career victories among active Division I coaches. Over his 30-year career, about 115 of his players signed professional contracts. Several of his former players and support staff have gone on to receive World Series rings from Major League Baseball organizations including: Bill Mueller (Red Sox in 2004), Ryan Howard (Phillies in 2008), Andrew Jefferson (Former pitcher and now a scout for the Giants), and Tyler Onstott (Former video coordinator and now working part-time for the Chicago Cubs).

Head coaching record
Below is a table of Guttin's yearly records as a collegiate head baseball coach.

See also
List of college baseball coaches with 1,100 wins
List of current NCAA Division I baseball coaches

References

Living people
Rend Lake Warriors baseball coaches
Mineral Area Cardinals baseball players
Missouri State Bears baseball coaches
Missouri State Bears baseball players
Truman State University alumni
University of Missouri–St. Louis alumni
Year of birth missing (living people)